The 1902 season in Swedish football, starting January 1902 and ending December 1902:

Honours

Official titles

Competitions

Promotions, relegations and qualifications

Promotions

Relegations

Domestic results

Svenska Bollspelsförbundets serie 1902

Svenska Bollspelsförbundets andra serie 1902

Svenska Mästerskapet 1902 
Final

Kamratmästerskapen 1902 
Final

Rosenska Pokalen 1902 

Final

Notes

References 
Print

Online

 
Seasons in Swedish football